Iasus or Iasos was a town in ancient Laconia, which Pausanias describes as belonging to the Achaeans. William Smith conjectures that Iasus may be the same as Oeum; the editors of the Barrington Atlas of the Greek and Roman World conjecture that it may be the same as Caryae.

Its site is dependent on which, if either, of the conjectures is correct.

References

Populated places in ancient Laconia
Former populated places in Greece
Lost ancient cities and towns